Chunibala Hansda is an Indian politician from West Bengal belonging to Jharkhand Party (Naren). She is the president of Jharkhand Party (Naren).

Biography
Hansda's husband Naren Hansda was a legislator of the West Bengal Legislative Assembly and their daughter Birbaha Hansda is a Santali film actress.

Hansda was elected as a member of the West Bengal Legislative Assembly from Binpur in 2000. Later, she was also elected from this constituency in 2006.

References

Living people
Jharkhand Party (Naren) politicians
People from Jhargram district
Santali people
West Bengal MLAs 1996–2001
West Bengal MLAs 2006–2011
Women in West Bengal politics
Year of birth missing (living people)
20th-century Indian women
20th-century Indian people
21st-century Indian women politicians